The Postmaster-General's Department (PMG) was a department of the Australian federal government, established at Federation in 1901, whose responsibilities included the provision of postal and telegraphic services throughout Australia. It was abolished in December 1975 and replaced by the Postal and Telecommunications Department. Two separate legal entities had been established in July 1975 to take over the department's operations: Telecom Australia (colloquially "Telecom"; later became Telstra) and Australia Post.

History

The Postmaster-General's Department was created in 1901 to take over all postal and telegraphy services in Australia from the states and administer them on a national basis. The department was administered by the postmaster-general.

The first permanent secretary of the department was Sir Robert Townley Scott, who held office from 1 July 1901 until his retirement on 31 December 1910.

In its first 25 years, the department grew from 6,000 to 10,000 offices and from 18,000 to 47,000 staff. Earnings grew from £2.4 million to £10 million per annum.

In mid-1975 the department was disaggregated into the Australian Telecommunications Commission (trading as Telecom Australia) and the Australian Postal Commission (trading as Australia Post). In 1993 the Spectrum Management Agency was formed to take responsibility of radio and television broadcast licensing, which was then merged into the Australian Communications Authority, that later became the Australian Communications and Media Authority. Telecom Australia changed its name to Telstra in 1995 and has since been privatised.

Abolition
The department was abolished in December 1975 by the Fraser government, and replaced by the Postal and Telecommunications Department. The change was intended to take account of the increase in the functions of the department to include all electronic media matters which had previously been the responsibility of the Department of the Media.

List of postmasters-general

List of departmental secretaries and directors-general
1901–1910: Robert Scott
1911–1923: Justinian Oxenham
1923–1939: Harry Brown
1940–1946: Daniel McVey
1946–1949: Bede Fanning
1949–1958: Giles Chippindall
1958: Van Vanthoff
1959–1961: Mervyn Stradwick
1961–1965: Frank O'Grady
1965–1968: Trevor Housley
1968–1972: John Knott
1972–1975: Eber Lane
1975: Fred Green

See also

 Australian Postal Commission
 Australia Post
 Australian Telecommunications Commission
 Telstra
 Telecommunications in Australia

References

Postal system of Australia
Telstra
Postal history of Australia
Defunct government departments of Australia
Ministries established in 1901
 
Ministries disestablished in 1975